Dick Boer (born 31 August 1957) is a Dutch businessman. From 2011 to 2018, he was the president and chief executive officer (CEO) of the supermarket chain Ahold Delhaize.

Early life
Boer was born on 31 August 1957.

Career
Boer joined Ahold in 1998, rising to CEO on 1 March 2011, succeeding John Rishton.

On 24 June 2015, when Ahold and Delhaize announced that they were to combine their businesses as Ahold Delhaize, it was stated that Boer would become CEO of the merged company, with Frans Muller, CEO of Delhaize to become deputy CEO and chief integration officer.

In July 2018, Boer retired and was succeeded by his deputy, Frans Muller.

Other roles
Boer is a board member of the Consumer Goods Forum. He is vice-chair of the executive board of The Confederation of Netherlands Industry and Employers (VNO-NCW). He is a member of the advisory board of G-Star Raw. He also has three roles at the World Economic Forum 2017: governor of the consumer industries community, steward of the future of health and healthcare system, and co-chair of the human centric health steering committee.

References

1957 births
Living people
Ahold Delhaize people
Dutch businesspeople
Dutch chief executives in the retail industry
People from Terneuzen